Richard Berman may refer to:
Richard Berman (lawyer) (born 1942), American lawyer and lobbyist
Richard M. Berman (born 1943), American judge
Rick Berman (born 1945), American television producer